Yoldiabukta is a bay in Nordfjorden at Spitsbergen, Svalbard.

References

Bays of Spitsbergen